is a ward of Kitakyūshū, Fukuoka, Japan. It covers 83.04 square kilometres, and had a population of 260,318 in January, 2005.  The ward contains JR Kurosaki Station, and JR Orio Station on the Kagoshima Main Line, with several schools and universities nearby. It is chiefly a residential area, bounded by the Onga river in the West.

In the south of the ward by the Onga river is Koyanose-juku, a former post town on the Nagasaki Kaidō which has recently become a tourist area.

Geography

Climate

Economy
Yaskawa Electric, a global electrical equipment and robot manufacturing company is headquartered in the ward.

Facilities
Honjo Stadium

Education

North Korean schools:
Kyushu Korean Junior-Senior High School
Kitakyushu Korean Elementary School (北九州朝鮮初級学校)

References

External links

Yahata Nishi ward office

Wards of Kitakyushu